The Order of National Social Scientists, abbreviated as ONSS  (Filipino: Orden ng mga Pambansang Alagad ng Agham Panlipunan) is an honor given by the Republic of the Philippines. The Order of National Social Scientists is the highest national recognition conferred upon Filipinos for life achievement in the Social Sciences.

Nomination and Selection 
The recipients of the Order of National Social Scientists are recommended annually by the National Academy of Science and Technology. It is the task of the Academy, which is composed of Filipino scientists, to recommend not more than ten (10) individuals who shall be accorded by the President the rank and title of National Social Scientists.It is the President of the Philippines who makes the ultimate selection, which is based on "distinguished individual or collaborative achievement in science and technology." National Social Scientists are given gratuities and are entitled to privileges enjoyed by National Scientists.

The Honors Code of 2003  was the code that created the Order of National Social Scientists, grouped and ranked with the Order of National Scientists and the Order of National Artists as the Order of Artistic, Cultural, and Scientific Merit of the Republic. This in effect removed social scientists under the purview of the Order of National Scientists, and established it as a separate order. As of 2020, the award has been given to a total of eight (8) social scientists. The last conferment was held last 2011 to National Scientist Raul V. Fabella for his significant contributions in the field of Economics.

Benefits

Awardees are conferred the rank and title of “National Social Scientist”, with an accompanying medallion and citation. They are also given a financial gratuity with the amount determined by the Academy. In addition, they are entitled to the same privileges enjoyed by National Artists of the Philippines, which include a monthly life pension, medical and hospitalization benefits, and a place of honour, in line with protocular precedence, at national state functions. They are likewise by law entitled upon death to a state funeral conducted by the National Academy and the Armed Forces of the Philippines, befitting their recognized status as heroes of the Philippines.

List of National Social Scientists 

As of August 2020, there have been five (5) men and three (3) women who have been designated as National Social Scientist in the roster where two (2) of them are currently living. The most recent conferment was made to honor NS Raul V. Fabella.

References 

National Social Scientists
Establishments by Philippine executive order